Kim Eun-sook (Korean: 김은숙, born 1973) is a South Korean screenwriter. She wrote the popular television dramas Lovers in Paris (2004), On Air (2008), Secret Garden (2010), A Gentleman's Dignity (2012), The Heirs (2013), Descendants of the Sun (2016), Guardian: The Lonely and Great God (2016–2017), Mr. Sunshine (2018), The King: Eternal Monarch (2020), and The Glory (2022–2023).

Career

Lovers "trilogy" and film debut
Kim first gained attention when her television drama Lovers in Paris became a major hit in the summer of 2004, with viewership ratings averaging 41.3% and a peak of 57.6% (#11 highest rated of all time). The cast and crew flew to France to film several scenes in Paris and Nice, igniting a trend among Korean dramas for overseas location shoots. A Cinderella-like story of a cheerful, ordinary girl who becomes the housekeeper of a cold and suave businessman, lead actors Park Shin-yang and Kim Jung-eun shared the Grand Prize ("Daesang") at the 2004 SBS Drama Awards. Then at the 2005 Baeksang Arts Awards, Lovers in Paris won the following awards: the Daesang, Best TV Actress for Kim Jung-eun, and Best TV Screenplay for Kim Eun-sook and Kang Eun-jung. It also became popular internationally, and Kim Jung-eun was named Best Actress at the 2005 Asian Television Awards.

Kim chose another European setting for her next drama, Lovers in Prague (2005). In a gender reversal, Jeon Do-yeon played a diplomat in Prague, Czech Republic, who falls in love with a police detective, played by Kim Joo-hyuk. Kim Eun-sook said she wanted to feature a romance in which the woman's social status is higher than her partner, and wanted to make the social difference between the two main characters as extreme as possible by also making the heroine the daughter of the president of South Korea. Kim added, "Although some might say it is another unrealistic story, a drama is a drama. I just want to make people enjoy the fantasy." Jeon won the Daesang at the 2005 SBS Drama Awards, and Kim Joo-hyuk won Best TV Actor at the 2006 Baeksang Arts Awards.

Kim tried her hand at writing for the big screen in the 2006 melodrama Fly High (also known as Loving is Okay). Directed by Kwak Ji-kyoon, it starred Ji Hyun-woo as a high school student who falls for a girl with a terminal illness (Im Jung-eun). The film was a critical and box office disappointment, and Kim soon returned to her milieu, television.

Despite overseas shoots in Hainan, China, the conclusion to Kim's loosely named "Lovers trilogy" was simply titled Lovers (2006-2007). Based on the Lee Man-hee stage play Turn Around and Leave (that also inspired the 1998 film A Promise), Kim again cast Kim Jung-eun, this time opposite Lee Seo-jin, as they played a plastic surgeon and a gangster entering into an unlikely romance. Though not as successful as its predecessors, Lovers recorded solid ratings in the high teens to low-20s.

On entertainment, politics, and body-swapping
Kim's next drama, On Air (2008), revolved around four entertainment industry figures - a newbie TV director (Park Yong-ha), an established screenwriter (Song Yun-ah, as Kim's alter-ego), a diva actress (Kim Ha-neul), and her struggling manager (Lee Beom-soo), whose personal and professional lives intertwine during the shooting of a fictional TV drama. Filled with cameos and a gossipy, insider look at stars behind the scenes, On Air was a hit, and director Shin Woo-chul (in his fourth collaboration with Kim) won Best TV Director at the 2009 Baeksang Arts Awards.

In City Hall (2009), Cha Seung-won played an elite deputy mayor with presidential aspirations who unexpectedly falls for an unwitting female government employee-turned-town mayor (Kim Sun-a). Though she left space in the script for Cha and Kim to ad-lib, Kim Eun-sook called it her funniest work. She said she used politics as a backdrop for the romance to show her idealism regarding public officials.

A love story between the rich, arrogant and eccentric president of a department store (Hyun Bin) and a brave but sweet stunt woman (Ha Ji-won) whose bodies switch souls whenever it rains, Secret Garden (2010-2011) became one of the biggest hits of Kim's career. After writing six dramas, Kim said she "contemplated on whether to write a drama that benefits the world or one that will garner good ratings" and decided to "abandon the depth I showed in City Hall" (which recorded solid, if unimpressive, ratings in the high teens). Instead, she "made an easy, light drama for the whole family to enjoy on weekends," and intentionally wrote it "to be fun." Secret Garden won Best TV Drama at the 2011 Baeksang Arts Awards, as well as Best TV Screenplay for Kim, Best New TV Actress for Yoo In-na, and the Daesang for Hyun. Kim also won Best Writer at the Seoul International Drama Awards, the Korea Drama Awards, and the Korea Content Awards.

Jang Dong-gun's TV comeback
By this time, the writer-director duo of Kim and Shin had gained a reputation for making hits, and their projects attracted high-profile actors. In 2012, after 12 years of acting in films, superstar Jang Dong-gun made his television comeback in A Gentleman's Dignity. Jang said that Kim and Shin's involvement in the project influenced his decision. After repeatedly alluding to him in On Air, Kim confessed her "ulterior motives" that she had really wanted to work on a drama with Jang. She and the crew were so determined to cast him in the lead that not only was the airdate moved back from March to late May to accommodate his schedule, but Kim, in the hopes of getting him to take the role, lied to Jang's wife, actress Ko So-young that there would be no kissing scenes. Instead, Kim wrote racy and sexy scenes, as befitting what has been called a "40-year-old, male version of Sex and the City." The drama portrayed the humorous love lives of a group of close-knit male friends played by Jang, Kim Min-jong, Kim Su-ro, and Lee Jong-hyuk, and previous On Air star Kim Ha-neul played Jang's love interest.

The Heirs
Kim said she wrote the hero of 2013 drama He Who Wishes To Wear the Crown Endures Its Weight: Heirs (also known as The Heirs or The Inheritors, 2013) specifically for actor Lee Min-ho. He starred opposite Park Shin-hye in a Gossip Girl-esque trendy drama set in a high school populated by the uber-rich. Kim said the biggest difference was writing about 18-year-olds when her previous characters had been in their thirties and forties, calling The Heirs "a teen romance for grown-ups". She admitted that she utilizes clichés, "but all my previous works used plenty of cliches and were embraced by audiences. The key is making characters that are different, so the audience forgets the clichéd setting. That's what I'm good at, and that is what I find fun. I want people to think, 'I've seen something like this before, but still this is strangely fun.'"

Descendants of the Sun and pre-produced dramas
Three years since The Heirs, Kim Eun-sook announced that she would be coming back with a human melodrama about a man and a woman who bond gradually as they save lives in disaster zones and end up falling in love. Titled Descendants of the Sun, the drama starred Song Joong-ki in his first television drama after military discharge along with Song Hye-kyo. Set in the fictional world of Uruk, Song Joong-ki plays a special forces captain who juggles peacekeeping duties with wooing a surgeon played by Song Hye-kyo. The military drama gained huge success and received immense popularity across Asia. It has given rise to the popularity of Korean soldier talk. The show also contributed to the rise of tourism in Greece, where scenes of the drama were shot.

The success of Descendants saw a change in tide toward pre-produced Korean dramas. However, in an interview, Kim Won-seok (co-writer of Descendants) stated that said there were some parts that could have been improved on if the show had been shot as it was being aired, per local industry norm.

Following the success of Descendants of the Sun, Kim Eun-sook wrote her next two dramas, Guardian: The Lonely and Great God and Mr. Sunshine for cable network TVN in 2016 and 2018. Both dramas held the highest average nationwide ratings recorded for cable dramas—12.955% for Mr. Sunshine, and 12.428% for Guardian: The Lonely and Great God—until the former's two-year long record was broken by The World of the Married in 2020.

Kim Eun-sook returned to free-to-air television with the series The King: Eternal Monarch on SBS. She worked again with Lee Min-ho of The Heirs and Kim Go-eun of Guardian: The Lonely and Great God in the leading roles. After premiering with a promising double-digit rating of 10.1%, the drama peaked at 11.6% for the second episode but ratings slid to as low as 5.2% during the eleventh episode, the lowest ever recorded for her works including her cable dramas with the series received criticisms for its screenplay, direction and editing, leading to lower-than-expected domestic popularity in Korea.

Kim reunited with Descendants of the Sun star Song Hye-kyo in the Netflix's series The Glory. The revenge series revolves around a victim of brutal high school bullying who dedicates her adulthood to plot revenge against perpetrators. It was released in two parts: Part 1 on December 30, 2022 and Part 2 on March 10, 2023.

Critical assessment

Kim's trademark is slick and glossy romantic comedies with fast-flying banter. Some critics have opined that Kim writes shallow characters, and she is as polarizing as she is successful. But not only do most of her dramas appeal to a wide age range of viewers and receive high ratings, but they often have that extra element that make them pop-culture buzz projects, whether it's due to a particularly catchy line of dialogue or a recurring joke.

In 2012, she received a Lifetime Achievement Award at the SBS Drama Awards.

Philanthropy 
On March 10, 2022, Kim made a donation  millions to the Hope Bridge Disaster Relief Association to help the victims of the massive wildfire that started in Uljin, Gyeongbuk and has spread to Samcheok, Gangwon. and donated money  millions to help Ukraine war victims.

On August 17, 2022, Kim donated  to help those affected by the 2022 South Korean floods through the Hope Bridge Korea Disaster Relief Association.

On March 7, 2023, Kim donated  to the Hope Bridge National Disaster Relief Association to help collaborate to restore Guryeong Village from the fire. Kim donated together with Hwa & Dam Pictures CEO Yoon Ha-rim, donating  each, totaling .

Filmography

Television

Film
 (2006)

Awards
2017 7th Korean Popular Culture & Arts Awards: Prime Minister Award
2017 53rd Baeksang Arts Awards: Grand Prize (Television) (Guardian: The Lonely and Great God)
2016 30th KBS Drama Awards: Best Writer (Descendants of the Sun)
2014 2nd Asia Rainbow TV Awards: Outstanding Scriptwriter (The Heirs)
2012 SBS Drama Awards: Achievement Award (A Gentleman's Dignity)
2011 Korea Content Awards: Prime Minister's Award in the Field of Broadcasting (Secret Garden)
2011 4th Korea Drama Awards: Best Writer (Secret Garden)
2011 6th Seoul International Drama Awards: Outstanding Korean Screenwriter (Secret Garden)
2011 SBS 상반기 작품상: 및 특별상 시상식 특별상 (Secret Garden)
2011 47th Baeksang Arts Awards: Best TV Screenplay (Secret Garden)
2009 SBS 상반기 작품상: 및 특별상 시상식 특별상 (On Air)
2005 SBS Drama Awards: Special Award (Lovers in Paris)
2005 41st Baeksang Arts Awards: Best TV Screenplay (Lovers in Paris)

References

External links

1973 births
Living people
South Korean screenwriters
South Korean television writers
Seoul Institute of the Arts alumni
People from Gangneung